PAOK FC B (Πανθεσσαλονίκειος Αθλητικός Όμιλος Κωνσταντινουπολιτών ,  Panthessaloníkios Athlitikós Ómilos Konstadinoupolitón, "Pan-Thessalonian Athletic Club of Constantinopolitans") is a Greek professional football club based in Thessaloniki, Macedonia.

Founded in 2021, it is the reserve team of PAOK, and currently plays in Super League Greece 2, holding its home matches at the Makedonikos Stadium.

Reserve teams in Greece play in the same league system as the senior team, rather than in a reserve team league. They must play at least one level below their main side, and thus PAOK B are ineligible for promotion to Super League Greece. They also cannot play in the Greek Cup.

Overview
All players will be able to move up and down in the first team, which means that if an injured player wants to prepare better, he will play in the second team and then return to the first team.
B Teams will normally participate in all competitive activities. They will not have the right to be promoted to the same category as the first team, but they will normally participate in the playoffs and playouts, but not in the Cup, where they will not have the right to participate. While, of course, if they occupy low places in the standings, they will be relegated like all teams.

History
Founded in 2021, became PAOK F.C.' reserve team and began to play home games at Makedonikos Stadium.
The team is intended to be the final step between PAOK Academy and the first team, and is usually made up of promising youngsters between the age of 18 and 23, with five or six players over that age to provide experience.

The team's first appearance in the Super League 2 came in 2021 at the north group of the division, finishing in the 8th position.

Facilities

Stadium

Makedonikos Stadium is a football stadium located in Thessaloniki, Greece. It is home to Makedonikos FC and PAOK B.

At the beginning PAOK B was supposed to play at Kaftanzoglio Stadium but "Dikefalos" talk about an unacceptable contract stating that another seat will be sought for the first team. The announcement in detail:

"After the unacceptable final contract sent by the administration of Kaftantzogleio Stadium for signing to PAOK FC, which violates every previous discussion and oral agreement, by order of the president, Ivan Savvidis, PAOK B does not intend to play in Kaftanzogleio.
The delay in the sending of the contract, and its sending just 5 days before the start of SL2 with subdued conditions, was done deliberately so that PAOK FC could be trapped. However, the team of PAOK B 'will play at the stadium of Makedonikos and the necessary actions have already been taken for the change of headquarters.

Training facilities

Lola's Sports Center is the training ground of PAOK B, located in Souroti area of Thessaloniki.

A very reasonable and absolutely sure choice was made for team B 'by the staff of PAOK.
Since the main thing was for the job to be done completely professionally, Souroti's choice probably seemed like a one-way street. The Lola family's training center is more complete than what a team requires to work.
Let us not forget that for years it hosted the first team and even when at its helm was one of the most demanding coaches, Fernando Santos.

Players

Current squad

From PAOK Academy

Out on loan

Coaching staff 

Source: PAOK F.C.

Seasons and managers statistics

League performance record
Only competitive league matches are counted.

Managerial statistics
Only competitive matches are counted.

See also
:Category:PAOK FC B players

References

External links
PAOK FC Academies
PAOK B
SUPER LEAGUE 2

PAOK FC
Football
Football clubs in Thessaloniki
Association football clubs established in 2021
2021 establishments in Greece
Greek B teams
Super League Greece 2 clubs